The Prairial was a supertanker, built in 1979 by Chantiers de l'Atlantique at Saint-Nazaire for Compagnie Nationale de Navigation. Prairial, which was the fourth and final vessel of Batillus class supertankers (the other three were Batillus, Bellamya and Pierre Guillaumat).  She was the only ship of that class to have a career longer than ten years, sailing until 2003, although under 
different names: Sea Brilliance (1985), Hellas Fos (1986) and Sea Giant (1997). She is also distinguished as the third biggest ship ever constructed, surpassed in size only by Seawise Giant (later Jahre Viking, Happy Giant, Knock Nevis, and finally Mont) built in 1976 and subsequently lengthened, and her sister ship Pierre Guillaumat.

The vessel was completed and commissioned in 1979. As other ships of Batillus class, she was laid up, arriving at Vestnes, Norway on April 5, 1983, but was sold and recommissioned in 1985. She was in service under different names and owners until 2003, when she arrived at Gadani ship-breaking yard in order to be scrapped.

Technical data
Length overall was 414.22 m, beam 63.05 m, draft 28.60 m, deadweight tonnage 555,046 (however, if she were loaded to the same freeboard as the Seawise Giant, at 233 tons/cm., her deadweight tonnage would have been on the order of 604,000 tonnes, unrivaled in maritime history), and gross tonnage 274,826. Propulsion was provided by two propellers each driven by two Stal-Laval steam turbines developing a total power of 65,000 Hp. The service speed was 16.7 knots, with fuel consumption of about 330 tonnes of heavy oil per day and fuel enough for 42 days.

The cargo was carried in 40 tanks with a total volume of 677,300 m3. They were divided into central and lateral tanks, whose dimensions was designed to reduce considerably the risk of pollution caused by collision or grounding. Ahead of the international standards of the time, the wing tanks had a maximum unit volume not exceeding 17,000 m3, which was reduced to 9,000 m3 in the most vulnerable parts of ship.

See also

Batillus class supertankers
Batillus
Bellamya
Pierre Guillaumat

References

External links
 Prairial at Auke Visser´s International Super Tankers
 Hellas Fos at Auke Visser´s International Super Tankers
 Sea Giant at Auke Visser´s International Super Tankers
 Article "Le Marin" du 5 juillet 1996  
 Promašene investicije u pomorstvu - Vijesnik Online 

Ships built in France
1979 ships
Tankers of France
Oil tankers